Jonchery-sur-Suippe (literally Jonchery on Suippe) is a commune in the Marne department in north-eastern France.

Geography
The commune is traversed by the river Suippe.

See also
Communes of the Marne department

References

Joncherysursuippe